Eduardo Antunes Coimbra (born February 5, 1947), better known as Edu, is a former Brazilian footballer who played as an attacking midfielder and went on to become a manager.

Background 
He was one of the most talented dribblers of the 1970s and is considered one of the best players in America Football Club's history. He scored 212 goals for America—which makes him the second highest scorer for the club—and also played for Vasco da Gama, Bahia and Flamengo.

Early life 
Edu came from a lower-middle-class family, in the suburbs of Quintino, Rio de Janeiro. His father was a goalkeeper and three of his brothers were professional footballers as well. However the most famous was Zico.

Career 
They played together in 1976 in Flamengo.

Coaching career 
He was a member of Zico's veteran team in Turkey during the coaching period of his brother Zico at Fenerbahce. The team has Brazilian members as Roberto Carlos's father Oscar Silva, Edu's brother and Fenerbahçe manager Zico, Fenerbahçe conditioner Moraci Vasconcelos Sant'anna (who was 3 World Cup coach of Brazil), Marco Aurélio's uncle Sebastião and Edu Dracena's brother whom were all playing or coaching for Fenerbahçe at that time.

He was also the assistant manager of Russia club CSKA Moscow, the team formerly managed by his brother and Brazil football legend Zico.

He is currently the assistant manager of Iraq national football team.

Honours

Player
 Copa Rio Branco 1967 – Brazil
 Taça Guanabara: 1974
 Bahia State Championship: 1975

Coach
 Taça Rio 1982
 Tournament of the Champions: 1982
 Paraná State Championship: 1989
 Rio State Championship: 1990
 Süper Lig: 2007

Individual
 Torneio Roberto Gomes Pedrosa's top scorer: 1969

References

External links

 Fenerbahçe SK official website
 Profil on TFF.org

1947 births
Living people
Footballers from Rio de Janeiro (city)
Brazilian footballers
Association football midfielders
Brazilian people of Portuguese descent
Campeonato Brasileiro Série A players
Brazil international footballers
Brazilian football managers
Campeonato Brasileiro Série A managers
Expatriate football managers in Ecuador
Expatriate football managers in Mexico
Expatriate football managers in Peru
Expatriate football managers in Iraq
Expatriate football managers in Japan
America Football Club (RJ) players
CR Vasco da Gama players
Esporte Clube Bahia players
CR Flamengo footballers
Joinville Esporte Clube players
Campo Grande Atlético Clube players
America Football Club (RJ) managers
Brazil national football team managers
CR Vasco da Gama managers
Iraq national football team managers
Joinville Esporte Clube managers
Criciúma Esporte Clube managers
Barcelona S.C. managers
Coritiba Foot Ball Club managers
Botafogo de Futebol e Regatas managers
C.D. Veracruz managers
Sport Boys managers
Clube do Remo managers
Fluminense FC managers
Campo Grande Atlético Clube managers
J1 League managers
Kashima Antlers managers